The Vuelta de la Juventud de Colombia is a road cycling race held annually since 1968 throughout Colombia. It is considered to be the under-23 version of the Vuelta a Colombia. Many successful professional cyclists won the race early in their careers, including Rafael Antonio Niño, Fabio Parra, Oliverio Rincón, Marlon Pérez, Mauricio Soler, Fabio Duarte, Sergio Henao, Carlos Betancur, Miguel Ángel López and Richard Carapaz.

Winners

Men

References

Cycle races in Colombia
Recurring sporting events established in 1968
Men's road bicycle races
1968 establishments in Colombia